Manuel Di Paola (born 6 October 1997) is an Italian professional footballer who plays as a midfielder for  club Vis Pesaro.

Club career
On 28 January 2019, he joined Monza on a loan contract with a purchase option.

On 30 August 2019, he signed with Virtus Verona. Virtus Verona contract was terminated by mutual consent on 5 October 2020.

On 9 July 2021 he joined Modena.

On 5 July 2022, Di Paola returned to Vis Pesaro on a two-year deal.

References

1997 births
Living people
Sportspeople from Parma
Italian footballers
Association football midfielders
Serie B players
Serie C players
Virtus Entella players
A.C. Monza players
Virtus Verona players
Vis Pesaro dal 1898 players
Modena F.C. 2018 players
Footballers from Emilia-Romagna